King of Hearts is a 1978 musical with a book by Joseph Stein, lyrics by Jacob Brackman, and music by Peter Link, orchestrated by Bill Brohn. It is based on the 1966 anti-war cult film of the same name.

Synopsis
Set in the fictional French town of DuTemps in September 1918, shortly before the end of World War I, its protagonist is Private Johnny Perkins, whose mission is to defuse a bomb intended to destroy the entire village. All the local residents have fled, leaving behind only the cheerful inmates of the insane asylum, who happily take over the town and proclaim Johnny their King of Hearts. The show raises the question of who is more insane, the asylum's patients or those who wage war.

Background
The Broadway production was directed and choreographed by Ron Field. After a Boston tryout at the Colonial Theatre and six Broadway previews, it opened on October 22, 1978 at the Minskoff Theatre and ran for 48 performances. The cast included Don Scardino as Johnny and Pamela Blair, Bob Gunton, and Millicent Martin in supporting roles. Santo Loquasto designed the sets.

New York City was in the midst of a three-month-long newspaper strike when the musical opened, and the lack of advertising and print reviews might have contributed to its quick demise. Of it, musical theatre historian Ken Mandelbaum recalls, "its score was only so-so; its theme (the insane are somehow "saner" than the sane) had a '60s feel; and its cast was not particularly distinctive." Critic and musical historian Peter Filichia calls it a "noble failure".

Two recordings of the score have been released: one, released on the Original Cast label, featuring the original Broadway cast and another with the 1982 Los Angeles cast.

In 2002 the Goodspeed revival, directed by Gabriel Barre, used the script as the authors, librettist Steve Tesich and songwriters Link and Brackman first intended, before other "doctors" were brought in.

Song list

 Act I
 "A Stain on the Name (of St. Anne's)" – Inmates
 "Deja Vu" – Madeleine
 "Promenade (The Transformation)" – Inmates
 "Turn Around" – Madeleine and Inmates
 "Nothing, Only Love" – Jeunefille, Johnny and Madeleine
 "King of Hearts" – Demosthenes, Jeunefille, Raoul, Madeleine and Inmates
 "Close Upon the Hour" – Johnny
 "A Brand New Day (The Coronation)" – DuBac, Johnny and Inmates
 

 Act II
 "Le Grand Cirque de Provence" – Raoul and Inmates
 "Hey, Look at Me, Mrs. Draba" – Johnny
 "Going Home Tomorrow" – Soldiers
 "Somewhere is Here" – Madeleine
 "Nothing, Only Love" (Reprise) – Raoul, Madeleine, Jeunefille and Johnny
 "March, March, March" – Johnny and Inmates

Awards and nominations

Original Broadway Production

References

External links
 

1978 musicals
Fiction set in 1918
France in fiction
Broadway musicals
Musicals based on films
Musicals by Joseph Stein